Andre Roberts (born February 24, 1965) is a retired American mixed martial arts fighter. A professional from 1997 until 2005, he fought in the UFC and the WEC.

Mixed martial arts record

|-
| Loss
| align=center|14-2-1
| Dan Christison
| Submission (armbar)
| WEC 13: Heavyweight Explosion
| 
| align=center|1
| align=center|3:26
| California, United States
|For the vacant WEC Super Heavyweight Championship.
|-
| Draw
| align=center|14-1-1
| Ruben Villareal
| Draw
| SB 38: SuperBrawl 38
| 
| align=center|3
| align=center|5:00
| Hawaii, United States
| 
|-
| Win
| align=center|14-1
| Gabe Beauperthy
| Submission (kimura)
| EC 57: Extreme Challenge 57
| 
| align=center|1
| align=center|3:34
| Iowa, United States
| 
|-
| Win
| align=center|13-1
| Johnathan Ivey
| Submission (bad position)
| SB 30: Collision Course
| 
| align=center|1
| align=center|1:38
| Hawaii, United States
| 
|-
| Win
| align=center|12-1
| Ray Seraille
| Submission (neck crank)
| SB 28: SuperBrawl 28
| 
| align=center|1
| align=center|2:49
| Hawaii, United States
| 
|-
| Win
| align=center|11-1
| Joe Campanella
| TKO
| EC 27: Extreme Challenge 27
| 
| align=center|1
| align=center|2:07
| Iowa, United States
| 
|-
| Win
| align=center|10-1
| Ron Waterman
| KO
| UFC 21
| 
| align=center|1
| align=center|2:51
| Iowa, United States
| 
|-
| Loss
| align=center|9-1
| Gary Goodridge
| Submission (punches)
| UFC 19
| 
| align=center|1
| align=center|0:43
| Mississippi, United States
| 
|-
| Win
| align=center|9-0
| Jamie Schell
| TKO
| ICF 1: Iowa Cage Fighting 1
| 
| align=center|1
| align=center|1:25
| Iowa, United States
| 
|-
| Win
| align=center|8-0
| Jamie Schell
| TKO
| MFC 1: Midwest Fighting 1
| 
| align=center|1
| align=center|1:35
| 
| 
|-
| Win
| align=center|7-0
| Dave Kirshman
| Submission
| MFC 1: Midwest Fighting 1
| 
| align=center|1
| align=center|0:10
| 
| 
|-
| Win
| align=center|6-0
| Phil Breecher
| N/A
| EC 19: Extreme Challenge 19
| 
| align=center|1
| align=center|0:35
| Wisconsin, United States
| 
|-
| Win
| align=center|5-0
| Harry Moskowitz
| KO
| UFC 17
| 
| align=center|1
| align=center|3:15
| Alabama, United States
| 
|-
| Win
| align=center|4-0
| Jason Brewer
| Submission (strikes)
| EC 15: Extreme Challenge 15
| 
| align=center|1
| align=center|0:39
| Indiana, United States
| 
|-
| Win
| align=center|3-0
| Sam Adkins
| Submission
| EC 11: Extreme Challenge 11
| 
| align=center|1
| align=center|4:02
| Iowa, United States
| 
|-
| Win
| align=center|2-0
| Jim Axtell
| Submission
| EC 4: Extreme Challenge 4
| 
| align=center|1
| align=center|5:41
| Iowa, United States
| 
|-
| Win
| align=center|1-0
| Trevor Thrasher
| Submission
| EC 2: Extreme Challenge 2
| 
| align=center|1
| align=center|3:59
| Iowa, United States
|

References

External links
 
 

1965 births
American male mixed martial artists
Sportspeople from Iowa
Living people
People from Tama, Iowa
Ultimate Fighting Championship male fighters
Mixed martial artists from Iowa